Schlyter, formerly Schlytern and Schlüter, is a family, known since the 14th century, that originated in Brabant but moved to Germany and Denmark, possibly because of religious persecution. The family came to Sweden from Pomerania with Herman Schlüter around 1592. In Blekinge, Sweden, members of the Schlyter family were mayors of the locality of Ronneby for about 100 years. When the city of Karlskrona, Sweden, was founded, the Schlyter family was at the forefront.

People with the surname Schlyter include:

 Carl Schlyter (born 1968), Swedish politician
 Carl Johan Schlyter (1795–1888), Swedish jurist and publisher
 Caroline Schlyter (born 1961), Swedish artist
 Charlotta Schlyter, Swedish diplomat
 Karl Schlyter (1879–1959), Swedish jurist and politician

See also 

 Schlüter

References

Notes

Sources 

Surnames
Swedish families